Pilithrude (8th century – d. between 725 and 730) was a Duchess consort of Asti by marriage to Theobald of Bavaria and Grimoald of Bavaria.

She married her former brother-in-law in 719. The marriage was extremely controversial in the eyes of the Catholic Church and resulted in the church refusing to acknowledge Grimoald's rule.

References 

8th-century Italian women
Duchesses of Bavaria
8th-century births
8th-century deaths